James Ira Newborn (born December 26, 1949) is an American musician, actor, orchestrator and composer, best known for his work composing motion picture soundtracks.

Life and career
Newborn was born in New York City. References to him as James Ira are the result of a joke and incorrect. 
He has scored or written songs for films such as Sixteen Candles, Weird Science, Ferris Bueller's Day Off, Uncle Buck, Planes, Trains and Automobiles, Mallrats, Ace Ventura: Pet Detective and Into the Night, for which he wrote music for B.B. King. He frequently worked with director John Hughes. He also stepped in as musical director and producer for The Blues Brothers. Newborn's many film credits also include a small acting role in Xanadu, in which he appears as a 1940s bandleader.

Newborn may be best known for composing the soundtrack for the Naked Gun series of police satires starring Leslie Nielsen. Newborn's brassy big band/blues theme song for the franchise first appeared on the TV series that inspired the films, 1982's Police Squad!.

Newborn has also worked in concerts and commercials, on Broadway and in the recording industry as a performer, arranger, composer and conductor.

He is also an adjunct faculty member at New York University, from which he received his bachelor's degree in 1972. Influenced by an eclectic variety of composers, such as Johann Sebastian Bach, James Brown and the Beatles, as a guitarist Newborn led and played in several musical groups before signing on as the musical director for the vocal group the Manhattan Transfer.

Newborn has contributed to albums by many artists such as Ray Charles, Diana Ross, Billy Joel and the Pointer Sisters.

As a songwriter
Newborn wrote two songs performed by B.B. King for the Into the Night soundtrack: "My Lucille" and "Into the Night." Two songs co-written by Newborn appeared on the Into the Night soundtrack album, but not in the film: "Don't Make Me Sorry," co-written by Joe Esposito and performed by Patti LaBelle, and "Keep It Light," co-written by Reginald "Sonny" Burke and performed by Thelma Houston.

Newborn co-wrote "Clap Your Hands" for the Manhattan Transfer and "Get It On and Have a Party" for Patti Brooks on the Dr. Detroit soundtrack. Both "Geek Boogie" from Sixteen Candles and "Geek Romance" from Weird Science were credited to Ira and the Geeks.

He co-wrote "I Guess I'm Just Screwed" for The Naked Gun 2½: The Smell of Fear with David Zucker and Robert LoCash. With Peter Segal, he co-wrote "The Food Song" for the Naked Gun : The Final Insult soundtrack.

Filmography

Film

Television
SCTV (1981) (TV)
Police Squad! (1982) (TV)
Tales from the Crypt (1992) (TV)
The Late Shift (1995) (TV)

References

External links
 
Ira Newborn at soundtrack.net
 

1949 births
20th-century American composers
20th-century American male musicians
21st-century American composers
21st-century American male musicians
American film score composers
American male voice actors
Living people
American male film score composers
Musicians from New York City
Varèse Sarabande Records artists